Darko Isidorović (born 17 April 1987) is a Serbian football forward.

Honours
Sutjeska Nikšić
 Montenegrin First League: 2012–13, 2013–14

References

External links
 
 Darko Isidorović stats at utakmica.rs
 Darko Isidorović stats at footballdatabase.eu

1987 births
Living people
Sportspeople from Valjevo
Association football forwards
Serbian footballers
FK Radnički Nova Pazova players
FK Zemun players
FK Bežanija players
FK Inđija players
FK Jedinstvo Užice players
Serbian SuperLiga players
FK Sutjeska Nikšić players
FK Budućnost Valjevo players
Montenegrin First League players